Emil Appolus (10 March 1935, in Vaalgras, ǁKaras Region - 28 May 2005, in Keetmanshoop) was a Namibian politician and businessperson. Living in Cape Town, Appolus was part of early discussions on Namibian independence. In 1957, Appolus became a founding member of the Ovamboland People's Congress, the forerunner to the current ruling party, SWAPO. When the OPC merged to create  SWANU,  Sam Nujoma and Fanuel Kozonguizi were two of the five members of the executive committee. He authored the first Black newspaper in Namibia, The South West News (Afrikaans Die Suidwes Nuus). The South West News was later banned for nationalistic content. After involvement in the 1960-65 Congo Crisis, Appolus ended up in Northern Rhodesia (now Zambia), where he was deported to Pretoria, South Africa for illegally leaving the country. After receiving bail, Appolus fled to Bechuanaland (now Botswana) en route to Tanganyika (now Tanzania). Appolus was the first SWAPO representative in Cairo, an important position for drawing support for national liberation. In 1969, Appolus was sent to represent SWAPO at the United Nations.

Break with SWAPO
Appolus, along with Andreas Shipanga and others, broke with SWAPO during the 1975-76 Shipanga Rebellion. Beginning in 1975, he led the Namibia Democratic Party. Returning to Namibia in 1978, Appolus became an early member of SWAPO-D. From 1985 to 1989, SWAPO-D was part of a Transitional Government of National Unity and Appolus was a member of the National Assembly. However, the TNUG and SWAPO-D were unpopular and SWAPO-D did not earn a seat in the first national elections in Namibian history, held in 1989.

Post-politics
Appolus retired from politics following the disbandment of SWAPO-D in 1989. He became a businessperson and at one time owned a fishing company.

Death
Appolus suffered a stroke in 2004 which physically weakened him. He died in Keetmanshoop on 28 May 2005 at the age of 70. He is buried in his home village of Vaalgras.

References

1935 births
2005 deaths
People from ǁKaras Region
SWAPO Democrats politicians
SWAPO politicians
Namibia Democratic Party politicians